KTXS-TV (channel 12) is a television station licensed to Sweetwater, Texas, United States, serving the Abilene area as an affiliate of ABC and The CW Plus. It is owned by Sinclair Broadcast Group alongside low-power TBD owned-and-operated station KTES-LD (channel 40). Both stations share studios on North Clack Street in Abilene, while KTXS-TV's transmitter is located near Trent, Texas.

KTXE-LD (channel 22) in San Angelo operates as a low-power satellite of KTXS-TV; this station's transmitter is located on West 26th Street in San Angelo.

History
The station signed on the air on January 30, 1956 as KPAR-TV. It was part of the West Texas Television Network, based at KDUB-TV (now KLBK-TV, channel 13) in Lubbock, and was a primary CBS affiliate with a secondary ABC affiliation. During the late 1950s, the station was also briefly affiliated with the NTA Film Network. The station's first studio was built on the eastern edge of Sweetwater; broadcasts from this location included a 6 p.m. newscast.

Grayson Enterprises bought the West Texas Television Network stations in 1961. Grayson opened a satellite studio in Abilene in the early 1960s, and soon moved most of KPAR's operations there. This resulted in the first of many fines from the Federal Communications Commission (FCC) for violating "main studio" regulations. In 1966, the station moved most of its operations to a new studio in north Abilene and the call letters were changed to KTXS.

Grayson nearly lost its stations, including KTXS, four times between 1968 and 1971 due to licensing issues. In 1977, their renewals were deferred pending a hearing. Grayson was accused of fraudulent billing, program and transmitter log fabrication, main studio violations, failure to make required technical tests, and other problems.

The case was settled in what was then described as a "distress sale" where the stations were sold to a minority controlled group (nowadays known as a historically underutilized group) at a reduced price. The company breakup helped define the parameters of such a sale. KLBK and KTXS were sold to Prima, Inc., who was granted a permanent waiver of the main studio rule. Sweetwater continues to be the FCC city of license with the KTXS Tower in nearby Trent.

In 1979, the station dropped CBS and became a full ABC affiliate after KTAB-TV (channel 32) signed on. Prima sold KTXS to Catclaw Communications in 1983. Catclaw in turn, sold it to Southwest Multimedia in 1985. Southwest Multimedia then sold the station to Lamco Communications in 1986. Lamco sold KTXS including 4 of its stations—WCYB-TV in Bristol, Virginia, KRCR-TV in Redding, California, WCTI-TV in New Bern, North Carolina and KECI-TV in Missoula, Montana to Bluestone Television in 2004. In September 2006, KTXS started broadcasting The CW on digital subchannel 12.2. Bluestone Television sold its stations (including KTXS) to Bonten Media Group in December 2006 for $230 million. The sale was completed on May 31, 2007.

On April 21, 2017, Sinclair Broadcast Group announced its intent to purchase the Bonten stations for $240 million. The sale was completed on September 1.

Programming

Syndicated programming
Syndicated programming broadcast on KTXS includes Tamron Hall, The Jennifer Hudson Show, Dr. Phil, Extra, Texas Country Reporter, and Full Measure with Sharyl Attkisson.

News operation

KTXS-TV presently broadcasts 17 hours of locally produced newscasts each week (with three hours each weekday and one hour each on Saturdays and Sundays).

On August 10, 2011, KTXS began broadcasting its newscasts in 720p high definition with a new set and new graphics.

Technical information

Subchannels
The stations' digital signals are multiplexed:

Analog-to-digital conversion
KTXS-TV shut down its analog signal, over VHF channel 12, on June 12, 2009, the official date in which full-power television stations in the United States transitioned from analog to digital broadcasts under federal mandate. The station's digital signal remained on its pre-transition UHF channel 20. Through the use of PSIP, digital television receivers display the station's virtual channel as its former VHF analog channel 12.

Coverage area

KTXS-TV serves as the ABC affiliate for 16 counties in West Central Texas that are part of the Abilene television market area (Brown, Callahan, Coke, Coleman, Eastland, Fisher, Haskell, Jones, Knox, Mitchell, Nolan, Runnels, Scurry, Shackelford, Stephens, Stonewall and Taylor). Through KTXE-LD, it also serves three counties in the San Angelo market (Concho, McCulloch and Tom Green).

KTXS also provides coverage for two other counties that are on the fringe of the actual assigned viewing market (Throckmorton in the Wichita Falls–Lawton market and Comanche in the Dallas–Fort Worth DMA. Throckmorton County was reassigned to the Wichita Falls–Lawton DMA from the Abilene DMA, as of September 2008.

References

External links

The CW Abilene
This TV Abilene

TXS-TV
ABC network affiliates
The CW affiliates
Television channels and stations established in 1956
1956 establishments in Texas
Sinclair Broadcast Group